Reinhard Appel (born February 21, 1927 in Königshütte; died June 26, 2011 in Bonn) was a German journalist and television presenter.

Life 
Appel worked as journalist for German broadcasters. He was married and had three children.

Awards 
 1970: Special contributions at Adolf-Grimme-Preis
 1972: Theodor Wolff Prize
 1972: Goldene Kamera in category best moderation for Journalisten fragen – Politiker antworten
 1976: Bundesverdienstkreuz 1. Klasse der Bundesrepublik Deutschland
 1981: Großes Bundesverdienstkreuz der Bundesrepublik Deutschland

References

External links 
 
 
 reinhard-appel.de – private homepage

German male journalists
20th-century German journalists
21st-century German journalists
German television journalists
1927 births
2011 deaths
People from Chorzów
Commanders Crosses of the Order of Merit of the Federal Republic of Germany
ZDF people
Stuttgarter Zeitung people